Färgelanda Municipality (Färgelanda kommun) is a  municipality in Västra Götaland County in western Sweden. Its seat is in the town of Färgelanda.

The present municipality was formed in 1974 when "old" Färgelanda Municipality (which in 1967 had absorbed Ödeborg) was amalgamated with Högsäter.

Its coat of arms is based on a medieval seal depicting a harrow, symbolizing agriculture.

Localities
Färgelanda 2,000 (seat)
Högsäter 750
Ödeborg 700
Stigen 350

Tourism
The scarcely populated municipalities in the historical province of Dalsland, with a total of 50,000 inhabitants, have a unified tourism information. Färgelanda with its low population is preferring to boast its nature. There are several opportunities for fishing, and Ellenösjön is a popular lake for pikeperch fishing. The nature reserve in Kroppefjäll offers walking lines and a mountainous nature. There is canoeing and swimming in the many lakes and streams.

Färgelanda also has an old and well-preserved ancient history. Rock carvings in Ödeborg are located by Brötegården Museum; furthermore there are some 140 grave fields from the Iron Age scattered in the municipality. Something in between a museum and a folk museum is Ödeborg's Fornsal, with more than 6,000 objects gathered from Dalsland in the last millennia.

References

External links

Färgelanda Municipality - Official site
Dalsland - Official page for Dalsland municipalities
Ödeborg's fornsal - In Swedish, English and German

Municipalities of Västra Götaland County
North Älvsborg